Alvin Greenwood Twitchell (May 13, 1892 – May 10, 1955) was an American football and basketball coach.  He was the first head football coach at Brigham Young University (BYU), serving from 1922 to 1924 and compiling a record of 5–13–1.  Twitchell was also the head basketball coach at BYU from 1920 to 1925 and at Colorado College from 1926 to 1930, amassing a career college basketball mark of 100–51.

Twitchell started his football coaching tenure at BYU in 1922 with a game against Utah Agricultural in Logan, Utah.  BYU lost the game 41–3.  Twitchell finished the year with a record of 1–5 with the only win coming against the Wyoming.  His career record at BYU was 5–13–1.

Head coaching record

College football

References

External links
 

1892 births
1955 deaths
American men's basketball coaches
Basketball coaches from Utah
BYU Cougars football coaches
BYU Cougars men's basketball coaches
Colorado College Tigers men's basketball coaches
High school football coaches in Colorado
People from Beaver, Utah